Iwasa (written: 岩佐, 岩浅 and 岩朝) is a Japanese surname. Notable people with the surname include:

Ayumu Iwasa (born 2001), Japanese racing driver
, Japanese artist 
Janet Iwasa, American cell biologist and animator
, Japanese gravure idol
, Japanese idol and singer
, Japanese boxer
, Japanese anarchist
, Japanese general
, Japanese professional wrestler
Yoh Iwasa (born 1952), Japanese academic

Japanese-language surnames